Number 115 Squadron is a Royal Air Force squadron operating the Grob Tutor T1, training QFIs for the RAF's Elementary Flying Training (EFT) squadrons and the University Air Squadrons, as well as undertaking evaluation and standardisation duties.

No. 115 Squadron was formed during the First World War. It was then equipped with Handley Page O/400 heavy bombers. During World War II the squadron served as a bomber squadron and after the war it flew in a similar role till 1958, when it was engaged as a radio calibration unit. The squadron disbanded for the last time as an operational unit in 1993, but reformed in 2008 at RAF Cranwell as No. 115(Reserve) Squadron, part of No. 22 Group, operating the Grob Tutor T.1 before moving to their present base at RAF Wittering.

History

Formation and First World War

No. 115 Squadron, RFC, was formed at Catterick, Yorkshire, on 1 December 1917 from a nucleus provided by No. 52 Training Squadron. At the end of August 1918, after having been equipped with Handley Page O/400 twin-engined bombers, it joined the Independent Air Force in France. Its first raid was made in the night of 16/17 September when nearly 4 tons of bombs were dropped on Metz-Sablon. For this raid the squadron was congratulated by Major-General Sir Hugh Trenchard and the OC 83rd Wing who described the raid as "the finest piece of work which has ever been done by a new squadron". Its most successful raid was made against Morhange airfield when five O/400s, making double trips, dropped  tons of bombs on their objective. During its service in France, No. 115 made fifteen raids, the longest being to Baden and dropped 26 tons of bombs. From November 1918, 115 Squadron was based at RAF Saint Inglevert. The squadron returned to England on 4 March 1919 and disbanded on 18 October 1919 at Ford Junction.

Reformation
The squadron was reformed from "B" Flight of No. 38 Squadron at RAF Marham, as No. 115 (Bomber) Squadron on 15 June 1937. It was now one of only two units to operate -temporarily- the Fairey Hendon monoplane bomber, but these were soon replaced by their intended equipment, the Handley Page Harrow. As these proved unsuited in the bomber role they were replaced from March 1939 with Wellingtons.

Second World War

In the Second World War, the squadron took part in scores of raids and also played an active part in Gardening (minelaying) for victory. In April 1940, while flying Wellingtons (and while on temporary loan to RAF Coastal Command) it gained the distinction of making the RAF's first bombing raid of the war on a mainland target-the enemy-held Norwegian airfield of Stavanger Airport, Sola. Sixteen months later, in August 1941, it undertook the initial Service trials of Gee, the first of the great radar navigational and bombing aids. As a result of its subsequent report on these trials Gee was put into large-scale production for RAF Bomber Command.

The memoirs of Sydney Percival Smith, a Royal Canadian Air Force Wellington pilot, contain detailed personal descriptions of 115 Squadron missions in late 1942 from its base in RAF East Wretham.  These were directed at targets in Germany (including Bremen, Stuttgart, Frankfurt and Munich) and Italy (Turin), as well as mine laying in French ports (LeHavre, Brest, St. Nazaire, and Lorient) and the Bay of Biscay.

Hercules-engined Avro Lancaster B.IIs replaced the Wellingtons in March 1943 and these were replaced by Merlin-engined Lancaster B.Is and B.IIIs in March 1944. The squadron relocated from RAF Little Snoring to RAF Witchford in November 1943.

Post-War (1945–1957)
The squadron was retained as part of the post-war RAF and received Avro Lincolns in September 1949. The squadron was linked to No. 218 Squadron from 1 February 1949 until 1 March 1950, when the squadron was disbanded at RAF Mildenhall.

The squadron was reformed on 13 June 1950, it became a Boeing Washington unit at RAF Marham, again having No. 218 Squadron linked to it. English Electric Canberras replaced the Washingtons in February 1954 and continued in use until disbanding on 1 June 1957.

Calibration (1958–1993)

The squadron came back on 21 August 1958, when No. 116 Squadron at RAF Tangmere was renumbered. It was now a Radar Calibration unit operating Vickers Varsitys, Valettas and briefly the Handley Page Hastings. Armstrong Whitworth Argosies began arriving in February 1968 and when the last Varsity was retired in August 1970, the unit was solely equipped with this type. No. 115 Squadron moved to RAF Cottesmore in 1968 (or possibly earlier). The squadron moved to RAF Brize Norton in 1976. Hawker Siddeley Andovers were added to the strength there in November 1976 and the last Argosy left in January 1978. In 1982, No. 115 Squadron was moved to RAF Benson, the Andovers continuing until disbanding there on 1 October 1993.

Flying training (2008–present)
The squadron was reformed on 1 October 2008 at RAF Cranwell as part of the reorganisation of the RAF's elementary flying training units, including the withdrawal of RAF students from the Defence Elementary Flying Training School at nearby RAF Barkston Heath. While three other dormant squadrons, Nos. 16, 57 and 85 Squadrons, were reinstated to carry out ab initio elementary flying training, No. 115(Reserve) Squadron was given the task of the Central Flying School (Elementary) Squadron of conducting the flying stages of the training of new Qualified Flying Instructors (QFIs). There are two courses run at the Squadron; for new instructors, the 'Main Course' includes 3 weeks of ground school and 80 flying hours, taking approximately 6 months in all. The 'Refresher Course', for previously qualified instructors of any background who have either spent time away from instructional duties or are changing the type of aircraft they instruct on, is 2 months long with 40 flying hours. The majority of graduates of the CFS courses will then work on one of the RAF EFT Squadrons, the University Air Squadrons or with the Army and Navy EFT Squadrons (674 Squadron Army Air Corps and 703 Naval Air Squadron respectively) at RAF Barkston Heath.

Aircraft operated

Orders, decorations, and medals
Members of the squadron have received the following orders, decorations, and medals.
142 DFC and 2 Bars to DFC
68 DFM
6 BEM
4 DSO
4 MBE
3 AFC
2 AFM and 1 Bar to AFM plus 1 CGM.

References

Notes

Bibliography

 Bowman, Martin. Voices in Flight - The Wellington Bomber. Pen & Sword, 2015. 
 Collins, Dick and Jim Halladay. Despite the Elements: The History of Number 115 Squadron, 1917–1982. Brize Norton, UK: Nettlebed Press, 1983.
 Halley, James J. The Squadrons of the Royal Air Force & Commonwealth 1918–1988. Tonbridge, Kent, UK: Air Britain (Historians) Ltd., 1988. .
 Jefford, C.G. RAF Squadrons, a Comprehensive record of the Movement and Equipment of all RAF Squadrons and their Antecedents since 1912. Shrewsbury, Shropshire, UK: Airlife Publishing, 1988 (second edition 2001). .
 Moyes, Philip J.R. Bomber Squadrons of the RAF and their Aircraft. London: Macdonald and Jane's (Publishers) Ltd., 2nd edition 1976. .
 Rawlings, John D.R. Coastal, Support and Special Squadrons of the RAF and their Aircraft. London: Jane's Publishing Company Ltd., 1982. .

External links

 No. 115 Squadron history on RAF website
 History of No.'s 111–115 Squadrons at RAF Web
 C-Cameron: Memoirs of World War II in Bomber Command by former RAF 115 Squadron pilot Donald Cameron

115
115
Military units and formations established in 1917
1917 establishments in the United Kingdom